Linda L. Upmeyer (born July 23, 1952) is an American politician who served in the Iowa House of Representatives from the 54th district from 2003 to 2021 and as the Speaker of the Iowa House of Representatives from 2016 to 2020. She was the first female Speaker in Iowa's history. She received her BSN from the University of Iowa and her MSN from Drake University.  On August 19, 2015, Upmeyer was elected by the members of the Iowa House of Representatives Republican majority to serve as the Speaker of the House.  Upmeyer's father, Del Stromer, served as Speaker from 1981–82.

Upmeyer serves on the Administration and Rules committee in the Iowa House.  She is also a member of the Legislative Council.

Biography 

Upmeyer was born in Mason City, Iowa, to Del Stromer and Harriett Ostendorf. She grew up in Garner on the family farm. First elected in 2002, Upmeyer serves as the Majority Leader of the Iowa House of Representatives. She is a cardiology nurse practitioner.  She is the National Chair of the American Legislative Exchange Council (ALEC), an organization funded by the Koch brothers and focused on limited government, free markets, and federalism.

Electoral history 

* = incumbent

See also 

 List of female speakers of legislatures in the United States

References

External links 

 Representative Linda Upmeyer official Iowa General Assembly site
 
 Financial information (state office) at the National Institute for Money in State Politics
 
 Profile at Iowa House Republicans

|-

|-

1952 births
21st-century American politicians
21st-century American women politicians
Drake University alumni
Living people
People from Clear Lake, Iowa
People from Garner, Iowa
People from Mason City, Iowa
Speakers of the Iowa House of Representatives
Republican Party members of the Iowa House of Representatives
University of Northern Iowa alumni
Women legislative speakers
Women state legislators in Iowa